Rail transport in the Congo may refer to:

 Rail transport in the Democratic Republic of the Congo, the former Belgian colony south of the Congo River whose capital is Kinshasa
 Rail transport in the Republic of the Congo, the former French colony north of the Congo River whose capital is Brazzaville